Victoria North was a  federal electoral district represented in the House of Commons of Canada from 1867 to 1904. It was located in the province of Ontario. It was created by the British North America Act of 1867, which divided the County of Victoria divided into two ridings: the South and North Ridings.

The North Riding initially consisted of the Townships of Anson, Bexley, Carden, Dalton, Digby, Eldon, Fenelon, Hindon, Laxton, Lutterworth, Macaulay and Drapper, Sommerville, and Morrison, Muskoka, Monck and Watt (taken from the County of Simcoe), and any other surveyed townships lying to the north of the North Riding.

In 1872, it was redefined to exclude townships included in the electoral district of Muskoka. In 1882, it was redefined to consist of the townships of Eldon, Fenelon, Somerville, Carden, Dalton, Bexley, Laxton, Digby, Longford, Lutterworth, Anson, Hindon, Galway, Snowdon, Minden, Stanhope, Sherbourne and McClintock, and the village of Fenelon Falls.

The electoral district was abolished in 1903 when it was amalgamated into Victoria electoral district.

Electoral history

|-
  
|Liberal
|John Morison
|align="right"|687 
 
|Unknown
|Hector Cameron
|align="right"|403
|}

|-
  
|Conservative
|Joseph Staples
|align="right"| 629
  
|Liberal
|John Morison
|align="right"|541   
|}

|-
  
|Liberal
|James Maclennan 
|align="right"|  564 
  
|Conservative
|Hector Cameron 
|align="right"| 560    
|}

|-
  
|Liberal
|James Maclennan  
|align="right"| 604 
  
|Conservative
|Hector Cameron  
|align="right"| 601    
|}

This by-election was declared void, and Mr. Cameron was declared elected on 17 September 1875.

|-
  
|Conservative
|Hector Cameron   
|align="right"|917 
  
|Liberal
|James Maclennan   
|align="right"|741    
|}

|-
  
|Conservative
|Hector Cameron  
|align="right"| 1,063  
 
|Unknown
|G.G. Keith
|align="right"| 773 
|}

|-
  
|Liberal
|John Augustus Barron  
|align="right"|1,442
  
|Conservative
|Hector Cameron    
|align="right"|1,141  
|}

|-
  
|Liberal
|John Augustus Barron  
|align="right"| 1,614 || 53.34
  
|Liberal-Conservative
|Samuel Hughes
|align="right"| 1,412  || 46.66
|}

|-
  
|Liberal-Conservative
|HUGHES, Samuel 
|align="right"|elected
  
|Liberal
| BARRON, John Augustus
|align="right"| 
|}

|-
  
|Liberal-Conservative
|HUGHES, Samuel  
|align="right"| 1,715    
  
|Liberal
|MCLAUGHLIN, R.J.
|align="right"|1,464  
 
|McCarthyite
|DELEMERE, J.H. 
|align="right"| 338
|}

|-
  
|Liberal-Conservative
|HUGHES, Samuel  
|align="right"|1,546    
  
|Liberal
|MCKAY, John 
|align="right"| 1,417  
|}

See also 

 List of Canadian federal electoral districts
 Past Canadian electoral districts

External links 

 Website of the Parliament of Canada

Former federal electoral districts of Ontario